David Magen (born David Monsonego; 4 September 1945) is a former Israeli politician who served as a Minister without Portfolio and Minister of Economics and Planning in the 1990s.

Life and career
Born in Fes in Morocco, Magen made aliyah to Israel in 1949, where he attended high school in Jerusalem. Between 1976 and 1986 he served as mayor of Kiryat Gat. In 1981 he was elected to the Knesset on the Likud list, and was re-elected in 1984 and 1988, becoming chairman of the party's local authorities elections headquarters in 1989. In March 1990 he was made a Minister without Portfolio by Yitzhak Shamir, becoming Minister of Economics and Planning in June that year.

Although he retained his seat in the 1992 elections, Likud lost power and Magen lost his ministerial position. He returned to the cabinet after Binyamin Netanyahu's victory in the 1996 elections, and was appointed Deputy Minister of Finance. However, he left the cabinet in May 1997. In February 1999 he was amongst the Likud MKs to break away from the party and establish Israel in the Center (later renamed the Centre Party).

Magen lost his seat in the 1999 elections, but returned to the Knesset in March 2001 as a replacement for Uri Savir. He lost his seat again in the 2003 elections.

He is married (1968) with Rachel Pinto and father of Shirit, Hadas and Smadar.

External links
 

1945 births
Living people
Centre Party (Israel) politicians
Deputy ministers of Israel
Government ministers of Israel
Israeli people of Moroccan-Jewish descent
Jewish Israeli politicians
Likud politicians
Mayors of places in Israel
People from Kiryat Gat
Members of the 10th Knesset (1981–1984)
Members of the 11th Knesset (1984–1988)
Members of the 12th Knesset (1988–1992)
Members of the 13th Knesset (1992–1996)
Members of the 14th Knesset (1996–1999)
Members of the 15th Knesset (1999–2003)
Moroccan emigrants to Israel
20th-century Moroccan Jews
People from Fez, Morocco